Marlene Patricia Malahoo Forte  is a Jamaican politician. She currently serves as Jamaica's Minister of Legal and Constitutional Affairs and was the Attorney General of Jamaica from 7 March 2016 to 10 January 2022. She served as a Senator for the Jamaica Labour Party from 2009 to 2016, and served as State Minister of Foreign Affairs and Foreign Trade from 2009 to 2012. Prior to entering politics, she served as a Resident Magistrate.

Forte received her early education at the Manning's School in Savanna-la-Mar, Westmoreland. She studied at the University of the West Indies, Norman Manley Law School and King's College London (LLM, 1999), obtained a master's degree in public administration from the Kennedy School of Government at Harvard University, and has lectured in criminal practice and procedure at the Norman Manley Law School.

Forte was elected to the House of Representatives as MP for  Saint James West Central in March 2016 after the Jamaica Labour Party won the 2016 general election on February 25 by one seat.

In June 2016, Forte criticized the U.S. Embassy in Jamaica for flying a rainbow flag following the Orlando nightclub shooting. Forte said it was "disrespectful of Jamaica's laws". Forte's comments were in turn criticized by others.

References

Living people
Government ministers of Jamaica
Members of the Senate of Jamaica
Jamaica Labour Party politicians
Jamaican Queen's Counsel
Harvard Kennedy School alumni
Place of birth missing (living people)
Year of birth missing (living people)
University of the West Indies academics
University of the West Indies alumni
Alumni of King's College London
Jamaican women judges
Attorneys General of Jamaica
Women government ministers of Jamaica
21st-century Jamaican women politicians
21st-century Jamaican politicians
Female justice ministers
Members of the 13th Parliament of Jamaica
Members of the 14th Parliament of Jamaica